Giacomo Candido (died August 1608) was a Roman Catholic prelate who served as Bishop of Lacedonia (1606–1608).

Biography
Giacomo Candido was born in 1566.
On 13 November 1606, he was appointed during the papacy of Pope Paul V as Bishop of Lacedonia.
On 19 November 1606, he was consecrated bishop by Fabio Blondus de Montealto, Titular Patriarch of Jerusalem, with Metello Bichi, Bishop Emeritus of Sovana, and Angelo Rocca, Titular Bishop of Thagaste, serving as co-consecrators. 
He served as Bishop of Lacedonia until his death in August 1608.

References

External links and additional sources
 (for Chronology of Bishops) 
 (for Chronology of Bishops) 

17th-century Italian Roman Catholic bishops
Bishops appointed by Pope Paul V
1608 deaths